Epikindyna Paihnidia (Dangerous games) is the debut album by popular Greek artist Elli Kokkinou. It was released in 1999 by Sony Music Greece. This album is currently out of print.

Track listing
"Kapoia Mera"
"Sto Epomeno Fanari"
"Epikindyna Paihnidia"
"Prepei"
"Auto Tha Kano"
"Tha Deis Mia Alli"
"Paramythenio Asteri"
"Kammeno Sidero"
"Stamata"
"Ki Omos Eheis Fygei"
"An Ginotan"
"Anagazomai"
"Prospatho"
"Ksehna Me"
"Den Hreiazetai"
"Oso Ki An Pethaino"

References

1999 albums
Elli Kokkinou albums
Greek-language albums
Sony Music Greece albums